The Dresdner Sezession (Dresden Secession) was an art group aligned with German Expressionism founded by Otto Schubert, Conrad Felixmüller and his pupil Otto Dix in Dresden, during a period of political and social turmoil in the aftermath of World War I. The group's activity spanned from 1919 until its final collective exhibition in 1925. During its heyday, the group consisted of some of the most influential and prominent expressionist artists of their generations, including Will Heckrott, Lasar Segall, Otto Schubert and Constantin von Mitschke-Collande, as well as the architect Hugo Zehder and writers Walter Rheiner, Heinar Schilling, and Felix Stiemer.

Much of what is considered by many art historians to be the true peak of German expressionist art occurred in the first decades of the twentieth century just prior to World War I. German expressionism of that period noted for its humourless and vicious criticism of the German government and upper classes, and was dominated by two major artistic groups known as Die Brücke (The Bridge), which was highly critical of Germany's increasingly imperialistic aggression and Der Blaue Reiter (The Blue Rider), which focused much of its commentary on industrialization's impact on the natural world. But the European war brought about the collapse of European society and the major art groups were swiftly broken up and scattered by the onset of the first world war. Those artists who failed to flee Europe found themselves conscripted to the front lines and many important artist such as Franz Marc and August Macke were killed in the trenches. During the war, European art seemed to take an unofficial hiatus amongst the carnage and it was not until peace returned in 1918 that a second generation of young German expressionists, many having endured the war through their late teens to early twenties, congregated into a variety of artistic movements opposing the violence of war.

In 1918, Conrad Felixmüller moved to Dresden, where he became the founder and chairman of the group. During his activities in Germany's progressive art and youth movements, Felixmüller worked for various newspapers including Die Sichel in Regensburg and Rote Erde in Hamburg). The Dresdner Sezessionists were heavily influenced by many of the other contemporary German art movements of their day. Many of the members kept a close eye on the flourishing avant-garde art movements such as the Dadaists. Artists like Dix adopted and appropriated many traits of dada such as the use of collage compositions into his own expressionistic style. Many founding members including Felixmüller, Dix and Schubert were active in a variety of other socially conscious, incendiary groups such the Novembergruppe.

The works of this new generation of disillusioned artists placed a much greater emphasis on political and social reformation through pacifistic means. Rather than adopting the nihilistic social criticism and cynicism of their Die Brücke predecessors, these new expressionist would instead rally around optimistic and utopian beliefs that a happier world built on the ideal of peaceful coexistence could emerge from the ruins of 1918. This dream however would die with the advent of World War II and the rise of the Third Reich in the decades to come.

Later years under the Third Reich 
Even though the group was officially dissolved in 1925 due to financial difficulties, the members would continue to have active and relatively successful political and artistic careers until the 1930s-40s when many were considered "Degenerates" by the newly formed Nazi Government and declared enemies of the state. Under antimodernist Alfred Rosenberg, many forms of modern art including Impressionism, Abstract, Cubism, Dada and Expressionism were declared illegal in the German state in preference for more realistic classical styles. This legislation led to an aggressive and oppressive smear campaign in order to curb and stamp out modern art. Suddenly Felixmüller, Dix and the rest of the former secessionists found their studios being raided by the Gestapo and their paintings burned in the streets. Many artists considered  lost their jobs at universities and museums and were forbidden from painting under threat of imprisonment. The few Jewish members, like the Brazilian-Lithuanian artist Segall, faced particularly harsh persecution and quickly emigrated from Germany; Segall himself moved to Brazil.

References

External links 
 http://museum.oglethorpe.edu/GermanExpressionism.html
 https://www.jewishvirtuallibrary.org/jsource/judaica/ejud_0002_0018_0_17954.html
 http://www.spaightwoodgalleries.com/Pages/Felixmuller.html
 http://www.moma.org/collection_ge/browse_results.php?criteria=O:AD:E:34110%7CA:AR:E:3&role=3
 https://web.archive.org/web/20120813083521/http://www.mariabuszek.com/kcai/Expressionism/Readings/Brrn2ndGen.pdf
 http://weimarart.blogspot.ca/2010/06/otto-griebel.html
 http://bilder.buecher.de/zusatz/27/27952/27952975_lese_1.pdf
 http://www.felixmuller-conrad.com/index.shtml

German artist groups and collectives
Weimar culture
German Expressionism